The 2016 USL season was the sixth season of the United Soccer League and the twenty-second season of USSF sanctioned Division III play organized by the United Soccer Leagues.

On August 6, 2015, the league announced that the season would consist of 30 games rather than 28 games played from 2013–2015. This was the first increase in the number of games since the league went from 24 games per season in 2012 to 28 games in 2013.

The league expanded from 24 to 29 teams in 2016. Six franchises were officially announced by the league: Swope Park Rangers, Orlando City B, Rio Grande Valley FC, FC Cincinnati, Bethlehem Steel FC, and San Antonio FC.
The Austin Aztex were on hiatus for the 2016 season, due to stadium availability issues, but planned to return in 2017 pending construction of a new, soccer-specific stadium.

Teams

Other venues
The Real Monarchs played three home games at other sites while Rio Tinto Stadium was being resurfaced: Aces Ballpark in Reno, Nevada, Clyde Field at Utah Valley University and Ute Soccer Field at The University of Utah in Salt Lake City.

Rio Grande Valley FC Toros played their first three games at the University of Texas Rio Grande Valley Soccer Complex while their stadium was being completed.

The September 7 game between New York Red Bulls II and Harrisburg City Islanders was played at Pucillo Field at Millersville University in Millersville, Pennsylvania.

Relationships with MLS clubs
There are 11 USL teams owned and operated by MLS clubs and 9 USL-MLS affiliations among the 29 USL clubs.

The two relationship types are treated the same by Major League Soccer.

Managerial changes

Player transfers

Competition format
The season started on March 25 and ended on September 25. The top eight finishers in each conference qualify for the playoffs.

League table
Eastern Conference

Western Conference

Results table

Playoffs

The team with the best record across both conferences earned the 2016 USL Regular Season title. The top eight teams in each conference advanced to the 2016 USL Playoffs, which were a single-elimination bracket crown two conference champions. The two conference champions advanced to the 2016 USL Championship.

The playoffs took place over the course of four weeks. The fixed seed format concluded with the USL Championship, which was held at the venue of the conference champion with the best regular season record.

Eastern Conference

Western Conference

USL Championship

Championship Game MVP: Brandon Allen (NYRB)

Attendance

The following table shows average home attendances, ranked from highest to lowest.

† One New York Red Bulls II home game was moved to Millersville, Pennsylvania because of a scheduling conflict.
Sources: kenn.com and USL

Statistical leaders

Top scorers 

Source:

Top assists 

Source:

|}

Top Goalkeepers 

(Minimum of 50% of Team Minutes Played)

Source:

League awards

Individual awards 
 Most Valuable Player: Sean Okoli (CIN) 
 Rookie of the Year: Brandon Allen (NYRB) 
 Defender of the Year: Aaron Long (NYRB) 
 Goalkeeper of the Year: Mitch Hildebrandt (CIN) 
 Coach of the Year: John Wolyniec  (NYRB)

All-League Teams 
First Team

F: Brandon Allen (NYRB), Jack McBean (LAG), Sean Okoli (CIN)
M: Danny Barrera (SAC), Villyan Bijev (POR),  Enzo Martinez (CHA)
D: Harrison Delbridge (CIN), Amer Didic (SPR),  Aaron Long (NYRB), Hugh Roberts (RIC)
G: Mitch Hildebrandt (CIN)

Second Team

F: Irvin Herrera (STL), Corey Hertzog (PIT), Cameron Iwasa (SAC)
M: Jose Barril (HAR), Kenardo Forbes (ROC), Yudai Imura (RIC)
D: Zach Carroll (NYRB), Joe Farrell (ROC),  Bruno Perone (WIL), Josh Suggs (COL)
G: Devala Gorrick (COL)

References

	

 
USL Championship seasons
2016 in American soccer leagues